Drumheller-Stettler is a provincial electoral district (riding) in Alberta, Canada. The electoral district is mandated to return a single member to the Legislative Assembly of Alberta using the first past the post method of voting. The district was created in the 2003 boundary redistribution and came into force in 2004 from the old districts of Drumheller-Chinook and Lacombe-Stettler.

The district is named after the towns of Drumheller and Stettler and covers a large rural portion of central east Alberta. It also contains the towns of Cereal, Consort, Hanna, Oyen and Youngstown and Dinosaur Provincial Park.

The district and its antecedents have been strongholds for Progressive Conservative candidates in recent decades. The current representative in the district is independent member Rick Strankman, who until January 2019 sat as a member of the United Conservative Party, was first elected as a Wildrose Party MLA in a provincial election on April 23, 2012. Mr. Strankman won his seat from Progressive Conservative Jack Hayden, who was first elected in a by-election on June 12, 2007. Before Hayden, Deputy Premier Shirley McClellan represented the riding as its first elected member in 2004.

History
The electoral district was created in the 2003 boundary redistribution after parts of Drumheller-Chinook and Lacombe-Stettler were merged. The 2010 redistribution saw Paintearth County transferred to this division from Battle River-Wainwright.

Boundary history

Representation history
The riding was created when the writ was dropped for the 2004 general election as a merger between Drumheller-Chinook and the eastern half of the Lacombe-Stettler riding. Deputy Premier Shirley McClellan, MLA for Drumheller-Chinook, defeated five other candidates to pick up the new district.

McClellan resigned her seat in the Legislature on January 15, 2007, the same day that former premier Ralph Klein resigned his seat in Calgary-Elbow. By-elections for both electoral districts were held on June 12, 2007.

The by-election saw a significant shift in support for the opposition parties with the re-emergence of the Liberal Party, which hadn't run a candidate in 2004, taking second place. The Alberta Alliance and NDP fared the worst, both retaining the same candidates from the general election, but dropping from second and third to fifth and last respectively. The Progressive Conservative candidate Jack Hayden won the district with a slightly reduced popular vote. Social Credit made surprising gains, jumping from last to third place, and Independent candidate John Rew also made a strong showing.

Hayden won his second term in the 2008 general election, winning a landslide. He was appointed to cabinet by Premier Ed Stelmach, first as Minister of Infrastructure until 2011, and then as Minister of Parks, Tourism and Recreation.

However, Hayden was narrowly defeated in the 2012 general election by Wildrose candidate Rick Strankman, famous for having gone to jail in protest of the Canadian Wheat Board. He was the first opposition MLA to represent the area since Gordon E. Taylor served as MLA for Drumheller in the 1970s.

In 2014 most of the Wildrose caucus, including Opposition Leader Danielle Smith, crossed the floor to the governing Progressive Conservatives in support of Jim Prentice's government. Strankman and four other Wildrose MLA's chose to remain with the party. In the 2015 general election, Strankman was re-elected by a much greater margin, as the Progressive Conservatives went down to a stunning defeat and Wildrose increased their seat count.

Wildrose subsequently merged with the Progressive Conservatives to form the United Conservative Party under Jason Kenney. While Strankman initially joined the party in 2017, he abandoned it in 2019 to sit as an Independent after losing the party's nomination to stand as candidate in the upcoming general election.

Election results

2004 general election

|}

2007 by-election

2008 general election

2012 general election

2015 general election

2019 general election

Senate nominee results

2004 Senate nominee election district results

Voters had the option of selecting 4 Candidates on the Ballot

Student Vote results

2004 election

On November 19, 2004, a Student Vote was conducted at participating Alberta schools to parallel the 2004 Alberta general election results. The vote was designed to educate students and simulate the electoral process for persons who have not yet reached the legal majority. The vote was conducted in 80 of the 83 provincial electoral districts with students voting for actual election candidates. Schools with a large student body that reside in another electoral district had the option to vote for candidates outside of the electoral district then where they were physically located.

2012 election

References

External links 
Website of the Legislative Assembly of Alberta

Alberta provincial electoral districts
Drumheller